Georgetown is a town in the Mid North region of South Australia. At the 2006 census, Georgetown had a population of 119.

Georgetown was one of the first towns to be surveyed in the upper Mid North when the Strangways Act was passed in 1869 to authorise resumption of pastoral leases to enable closer settlement for more intensive farming purposes. It was surveyed in 1869, along with Redhill. It was the seat of the District Council of Georgetown from 1876 to 1988, but following two successive amalgamations with neighbouring councils, it is now part of the Northern Areas Council.

Georgetown was on the Gladstone railway line from Adelaide. This was constructed in 1894 as  narrow gauge. It was converted to  broad gauge in 1927 and closed in 1988.

Geography and climate

References

Towns in South Australia
Mid North (South Australia)